Pallenis maritima (syn. Asteriscus maritimus) is a herbaceous perennial in the family Asteraceae. The species is native to the Canary Islands, southern Portugal, the western Mediterranean, and Greece. It grows up to 30 cm high and 45 cm in width and produces yellow "daisy" flowerheads with darker yellow centres.

Cultivation
This species prefers a well-drained, preferably sandy soil with moderate levels of moisture and exposure to full sun. It is well-suited to rock gardens and container cultivation. Propagation is by seed or cuttings.

References

Asteriscus maritimus Missouri Botanic Garden Kemper Centre Plant Finder

Inuleae
Flora of the Canary Islands
Taxa named by Carl Linnaeus